Armori is the Municipal council in district of Gadchiroli, Maharashtra.

History
The Armori municipal council established on 12 September 2017.

Municipal Council election

Electoral performance 2019

References 

Municipal councils in Maharashtra